The LIP6, the computer science laboratory of Sorbonne University's Faculty of Science and Engineering is a joint research laboratory of Sorbonne University and CNRS, the French national research organization. The current name comes from the acronym of its historical name, Laboratoire d'Informatique de Paris 6. It was founded in January, 1997, with the fusion of three smaller laboratories: LAFORIA, LITP, and MASI. Employing over 150 permanent professors and research scientists, LIP6 is one of the largest computer science laboratories in France.

Research activities

LIP6's research activities are organized around five general areas of research:
Embedded systems   
Scientific computation   
Networking and Distributed systems   
Databases and Machine learning   
Decision making and Optimization

See also

References and sources 
 Rapport du comité d'experts. Report on LIP6 by a committee of independent experts. Published by AERES (Agence de l'évaluation de la recherche et de l'enseignement supérieur), France's independent research evaluation agency. February 2008. This report states: "Sa notoriété scientifique nationale et européenne est globalement très bonne" ("Its national and international scientific reputation is overall very good").  Retrieved 2013-03-02.

External links
  

Research institutes in France
Computer science institutes in France
French National Centre for Scientific Research
1997 establishments in France